The Eye of the Giant is an original novel written by Christopher Bulis and based on the long-running British science fiction television series Doctor Who. It features the Third Doctor, Liz Shaw and UNIT. It takes place prior to the Missing Adventure The Scales of Injustice by Gary Russell.

Summary
The Doctor and Liz Shaw investigate a mysterious artifact, and trace its origin back in time to the island of Salutua, 1934, where an expedition is taking place concerning the island's unusual inhabitants. Meanwhile, Brigadier Lethbridge Stewart faces a major epidemic of UFO sightings and supernatural occurrences that threaten to bring about worldwide panic.

References

External links
The Cloister Library – The Eye of the Giant

1996 British novels
1996 science fiction novels
Virgin Missing Adventures
Third Doctor novels
Novels by Christopher Bulis
Fiction set in 1934